Chryseobacterium luteum is a bacterium from the genus of Chryseobacterium which has been isolated from phyllosphere of grasses in Paulinenaue in Brandenburg in Germany.

References

Further reading

External links
Type strain of Chryseobacterium luteum at BacDive -  the Bacterial Diversity Metadatabase

luteum
Bacteria described in 2007